Arthur Henderson (1863–1935) was a British politician and union leader, Leader of the Labour Party.

Arthur Henderson may also refer to:

Arthur Henderson (baseball) (1897–1988), Negro league baseball player
Arthur Henderson (VC) (1893–1917), British Army officer
Arthur Henderson, Baron Rowley (1893–1968), British Labour Party politician

See also